"The First Step" is a song written by Doug Crider and Verlon Thompson, and recorded by American country music artist Tracy Byrd.  It was released in November 1994 as the third single from the album No Ordinary Man.  The song reached number 5 on the Billboard Hot Country Singles & Tracks chart.

Critical reception
Deborah Evans Price, of Billboard magazine reviewed the song favorably, saying that the song continues Byrd's pattern of two-step cliches, but that he manages to "inject more than enough spirit to get this one over." Price concludes that Byrd was "born to sing this stuff."

Chart performance

Year-end charts

References

1994 singles
1994 songs
Tracy Byrd songs
MCA Records singles
Songs written by Verlon Thompson
Song recordings produced by Jerry Crutchfield